Tunga Bridge in Thirthahalli, Karnataka, India, is the one of the oldest bridges constructed across the Tunga River.

This bridge is over 75 years old and it was designed by, and built under supervision of, Bharat Ratna Sir M. Visvesvaraya. The bridge connects the area Kuruvalli with Thirthahalli. Tunga Bridge is also called Jayachamarajendra Bridge.

The Tunga Bridge draws many visitors, especially on weekends to see the uniqueness of the bridge.

Bridge structure
This bridge has an arc-like structure at the top which is supported by consecutive pillars on either side of the bridge. There are beam-like structures on the top, connecting the two arcs, appearing as a roof. This unique bridge resembles the Sydney Harbour Bridge but with a slight difference.

History
The bridge was completed in 1943, and inaugurated by H. H. Jayachamarajendra Wadiyar, then the Maharaja of Mysore, and also named after him.

See also

References

Bridges in Karnataka
Bridges completed in 1943
Transport in Shimoga district
Buildings and structures in Shimoga district
20th-century architecture in India